Check-In is an album by jazz pianist Roberto Magris released on the Soul Note label in 2005, and including performances by the Roberto Magris Europlane featuring saxophonist Tony Lakatos.

Reception

The AllMusic review by Alain Drouot awarded the album 4 stars and simply states: "For some years, Europlane has been an important vehicle for Italian pianist Roberto Magris. The version featured on Check-In delivers some straight-ahead jazz of the finest order -- inventive, yet accessible."

Track listing

  I Remember You (Schertzinger/Mercer) – 7:19
 Blues for my Sleeping Baby (Roberto Magris) - 12:29
 African Mood (Roberto Magris) - 9:35
 Luci Lontane (Roberto Magris) - 6:20
 What Blues? (Roberto Magris) - 5:26
 Why Did I Choose You (Martin/Leonard) - 6:00
 I Concentrate on You (Cole Porter) - 7:26
 Che Cosa C’è (Gino Paoli) - 3:26

Personnel

Musicians
Tony Lakatos – tenor sax and soprano sax
Michael Erian – tenor sax and soprano sax
Roberto Magris – piano
Robert Balzar – bass
Gabriele Centis – drums
Fulvio Zafret – congas (on # 3)

Production
 Roberto Magris and Gabriele Centis – co-producers
 Flavio Bonandrini – executive producer
 Fulvio Zafret – engineering
 Maria Bonandrini – design

References

2011 albums
Roberto Magris albums
Black Saint/Soul Note albums